Liberty Center is a mixed-use retail shopping mall, residential, and office complex in Liberty Township, Butler County, Ohio, United States. The center was built by Steiner Realty. Major tenants include Dillard's, Dick's Sporting Goods, Cobb Theatres, and AC Hotels.

History
Upon opening in October 2015, Liberty Center had over 94 retailers and restaurants, including a Cobb Theatres CineBistro dine-in theater. Also included in the original development were an AC Hotels and 249 apartments. Steiner & Associates chose the mall's site, on Liberty Way southwest of the junction of Interstate 75 and Ohio State Route 129, due to a lack of retail options between Cincinnati and Dayton. The retail portion of the complex consists of two portions: an outdoor lifestyle center with shops facing a street, and a two-story, enclosed mall known as the Foundry. The main anchor stores to The Foundry are Dick's Sporting Goods and Dillard's, the latter of which replaced a store at Tri-County Mall in Springdale.

In September 2018, developers Steiner + Associates transferred leasing and management duties of the mall to JLL. At the time of transfer, representatives noted that the mall had seen over 7 million visitors and a more than 10 percent increase in retail tenancy in the past year.

Gap Inc. closed its store at the mall in late 2018, while Claire's, a library, a local home decor store called Burlap & Birch, and an indoor skydiving center all opened.

See Also
 Bayshore
 The Greene Town Center 
 Zona Rosa
 Easton Town Center

References

2015 establishments in Ohio
Buildings and structures in Butler County, Ohio
JLL (company)
Shopping malls established in 2015
Shopping malls in Ohio
Tourist attractions in Butler County, Ohio